Relationship Theatre is a registered trademark developmental model pioneered by the United Kingdom-based charity and social enterprise Ladder to the Moon to help caregivers interact more successfully with individuals living with dementia, learning disabilities and advanced old age.

Program process
The process involves professional actors and coaches experienced in social care, who creatively coach and interact with staff, residents and volunteers in care homes. Movie-based scenarios are played out, with the aim of fostering a greater level of engagement with residents.

Relationship Theatre programmes are designed to become integrated with the day-to-day running of the care environment, and have been successfully run in several British care homes.

See also
 Caregiving and dementia
 Dementia
 Elderly care

External links
 Ladder to the Moon

Elderly care